The Royal Danish Military Academy educates and commissions all officers for the Royal Danish Army. The Military Academy function was initiated in 1713 by request of King Frederick IV on inspiration from the Naval Academy.

Location
The academy has, since 1869, been located at Frederiksberg Palace in central Copenhagen.

Other Danish officer academies
 Navy: The Royal Danish Naval Academy located at Svanemøllens Barracks in Copenhagen.
 Air force: The Royal Danish Air Force Academy located at Svanemøllen Barracks in Copenhagen.
 Emergency Management Agency: The Emergency Management Officers School located at Bernstorff Palace in Gentofte

References

Academy
1713 establishments in Denmark
Army
Forsvaret
Educational institutions established in 1713
Army Officers Academy